The Philadelphia Award is given each year to a citizen of the Philadelphia region who, during the preceding year, acted and served on behalf of the best interests of the community. Created by Edward William Bok in 1921, The Philadelphia Award is among the most cherished, meaningful and prestigious awards conferred in, by and for the Philadelphia community. In establishing the Award, Bok wrote, "service to others tends to make lives happy and communities prosperous." He believed that "the idea of service as a test of good citizenship should be kept constantly before the minds of the people of Philadelphia."

Since its inception, The Philadelphia Award has recognized the achievements of more than 80 individuals. Its recipients have been some of the most distinguished Philadelphians, including industrialists, educators, lawyers, political figures, scientists, physicians, members of the clergy, social activists, philosophers, musicians, artists, architects and writers.

Life and career of founder Edward W. Bok (1863-1930)
Edward William Bok (born Eduard Willem Gerard Cesar Hidde Bok) (October 9, 1863 – January 9, 1930) was born in Den Helder, Netherlands. At the age of six, he immigrated to Brooklyn, New York. In Brooklyn he washed the windows of a bakery shop after school to help support his family. His people were so poor that in addition he used to go out in the street with a basket every day and collect stray bits of coal that had fallen in the gutter where the coal wagons had delivered fuel.

In 1882 Edward Bok began work with Henry Holt and Company.  In 1884 he became involved with Charles Scribner's Sons, where he eventually became its advertising manager. From 1884 until 1887 Bok was the editor of The Brooklyn Magazine, and in 1886 he founded the Bok Syndicate Press.

After moving to Philadelphia in 1889, he obtained the editorship of Ladies Home Journal when its founder and editor Louisa Knapp Curtis stepped down to a less intense role at the popular, nationally circulated publication. It was published by Cyrus Curtis, who had an established publishing empire that included many newspapers and magazines.

In 1896 Bok married Mary L. Curtis, the daughter of Louisa and Cyrus Curtis. She shared her family's interest in music, cultural activities, and philanthropy and was very active in social circles.

During his editorship, the Journal became the first magazine in the world to have one million subscribers and it became very influential among readers by featuring informative and progressive ideas in its articles. The magazine focused upon the social issues of the day. The mother of H.L. Mencken was one of those busy and amiable housewives who read Edward Bok’s Ladies’ Home Journal year after passing year. When Bok’s autobiography, The Americanization of Edward Bok, appeared in 1920, he reviewed it with an interest based on long acquaintance with the magazine.  Mencken observed that Bok showed an irrepressible interest in things artistic:

When he looked at the houses in which his subscribers lived, their drab hideousness made him sick. When he went inside and contemplated the lambrequins, the gilded cattails, the Rogers groups, the wax fruit under glass domes, the emblazoned seashells from Asbury Park, the family Bible on the marble-topped center-table, the crayon enlargements of Uncle Richard and Aunt Sue, the square pianos, the Brussels carpets, the grained woodwork—when his eyes alighted upon such things, his soul revolted, and at once his moral enthusiasm incited him to attempt a reform. The result was a long series of Ladies’ Home Journal crusades against the hideousness of the national scene – in domestic architecture, in house furnishing, in dress, in town buildings, in advertising. Bok flung himself headlong into his campaigns, and practically every one of them succeeded. ... If there were gratitude in the land, there would be a monument to him in every town in the Republic. He has been, aesthetically, probably the most useful citizen that ever breathed its muggy air.

The Journal also became the first magazine to refuse patent medicine advertisements. In 1919, after thirty years at the journal, Bok retired.

In 1924 Mary Louise Bok founded the Curtis Institute of Music in Philadelphia, which she dedicated to her father, Cyrus Curtis, and in 1927, the Boks embarked upon the construction of Bok Tower Gardens, near their winter home in Mountain Lake Estates, Lake Wales, Florida, which was dedicated on February 1, 1929, by the president of the United States, Calvin Coolidge.  Bok Tower sometimes is called a sanctuary and is listed on the National Register of Historic Places as a National Historic Landmark. Bok is used as an example in Dale Carnegie's How to Win Friends and Influence People.

Bok died on January 9, 1930, in Lake Wales, Florida, within sight of his beloved Singing Tower.  Two of his grandsons are Derek Bok and Gordon Bok.

Bok and American domestic architecture

In 1895, Bok began publishing in Ladies Home Journal plans for building houses which were affordable for the American middle class – from $1,500 to $5,000 – and made full specifications with regional prices available by mail for $5.  Later, Bok and the Journal became a major force in promoting the "bungalow", a style of residence which derived from India. Plans for these houses cost as little as a dollar, and the -story dwelling, some as small as 800 square feet, soon became a dominant form of new domestic architecture in the country.

Some architects complained that by making building plans available on a mass basis, Bok was usurping their prerogatives, and some, such as Stanford White openly discouraged him – although White would later come around, writing I believe that Edward Bok has more completely influenced American domestic architecture for the better than any man in this generation. When he began ... I refused to cooperate with him. If Bok would come to me now, I would not only make plans for him, but I would waive my fee for them in retribution for my early mistake.

Bok is credited with coining the term living room as the name for room of a house that was commonly called a parlor or drawing room.  This room had traditionally been used only on Sundays or for formal occasions such as the displaying of deceased family members before burial; it was the buffer zone between the public sphere and the private one of the rest of the house.  Bok believed it was foolish to create an expensively furnished room that was rarely used, and promoted the new name to encourage families to use the room in their daily lives.  He wrote, "We have what is called a 'drawing room'. Just whom or what it 'draws' I have never been able to see unless it draws attention to too much money and no taste..."

Bok's overall concern was to preserve his socially conservative vision of the ideal American household, with the wife as homemaker and child-rearer, and the children raised in a healthy, natural setting, close to the soil.  To this end, he promoted the suburbs as the best place for well-balanced domestic life.

Theodore Roosevelt said about Bok:[He] is the only man I ever heard of who changed, for the better, the architecture of an entire nation, and he did it so quickly and effectively that we didn't know it was begun before it was finished.

Creation of The Philadelphia Award
In 1921, Bok created The Philadelphia Award  - among the most cherished, meaningful and prestigious awards conferred in, by and for the Philadelphia community. The award is given each year to a citizen of the Philadelphia region who, during the preceding year, acted and served on behalf of the best interests of the community. In establishing the Award, Bok wrote, "service to others tends to make lives happy and communities prosperous." He believed that "the idea of service as a test of good citizenship should be kept constantly before the minds of the people of Philadelphia."

Since its inception, The Philadelphia Award has recognized the achievements of more than 80 individuals. Its recipients have been some of the most distinguished Philadelphians, including industrialists, educators, lawyers, political figures, scientists, physicians, members of the clergy, social activists, philosophers, musicians, artists, architects and writers. All are bonded by a shared vision: Make the city and the region more prosperous, efficient and beautiful by enriching, educating, inspiring and caring for those who live there. The Philadelphia Award is administered by a Board of Trustees and carries an honorarium of $25,000.

Winners

 2020 - Ala Stanford
 2020 - Brian L. Roberts
 2019 - Rev. Luis Cortés, Jr.
 2019 - Nicole Kligerman
 2019 - Amy J. Goldberg
 2018 - Sylvester Mobley
 2017 - Mel Heifetz
 2016 - Charles L. Blockson
 2015 - Marsha Levick
 2014 - Kenneth Gamble
 2014 - Suzanne & Ralph Roberts
 2013 - Leigh & John Middleton
 2012 - Carl H. June, MD
 2011 - Aileen K. Roberts & Joseph Neubauer
 2010 - Alice S. Bast
 2009 - Joan Myers Brown
 2008 - H. Fitzgerald Gerry & Marguerite Lenfest
 2007 - Marciene Mattleman
 2006 - Leonore Annenberg
 2005 - Paul R. Levy
 2004 - Gloria Guard
 2003 - Judith Rodin
 2002 - Lorene Cary
 2001 - Bernard C. Watson
 2000 - Ernesta D. Ballard
 1999 - Cecilia Moy Yep
 1998 - Graham S. Finney
 1997 - Anne d'Harnoncourt
 1997 - Jane Golden
 1996 - Arlin Adams
 1995 - Edward G. Rendell
 1995 - John F. Street
 1994 - Jeremy Nowak
 1993 - The Hon. Walter H. Annenberg
 1992 - Denise Scott-Brown & Robert Venturi
 1991 - Sr. Mary Scullion, RSM
 1990 - Herman Mattleman
 1989 - Hilary Koprowsky
 1988 - G. Stockton Strawbridge
 1987 - Elaine Brown
 1986 - Willard G. Rouse III
 1985 - Rev. Paul M. Washington
 1984 - Jennifer A. Allcock
 1983 - Edmund N. Bacon
 1982 - Carolyn L. Johnson
 1981 - Edmund Wolf II
 1980 - William M. Sample
 1979 - Robert Austrian
 1978 - Michael J. Sherman & Stephen Shutt
 1977 - R. Stewart Rauch
 1976 - Jonathan E. Rhoads
 1975 - Robert W. Crawford
 1975 - Perry C. Fennell, Jr.
 1975 - Melvin Floyd
 1975 - John C. Haas
 1975 - Ruth W. Hayre
 1975 - Floyd L. Logan
 1975 - Sol Schoenbach
 1975 - Irving W. Shandler
 1974 - William Henry Hastie
 1973 - Ruth Patrick
 1972 - J. Presper Eckert & John W. Mauchly
 1971 - Franklin C. Watkins
 1970 - Louis I. Kahn
 1969 - Eugene Ormandy
 1968 - Marcus Albert Foster
 1967 - Richardson Dilworth
 1966 - Lessing J. Rosenwald
 1965 - Rev. Leon H. Sullivan
 1964 - Gaylord P. Harnwell
 1963 - John H. Gibbon, Jr.
 1962 - George W. Taylor
 1961 - Edwin O. Lewis
 1960 - Allston Jenkins
 1959 - Harry A. Batten
 1958 - Helen C. Bailey
 1957 - Catherine Drinker Bowen
 1956 - Isidor S. Ravdin
 1955 - Joseph S. Clark, Jr.
 1954 - Esmond R. Long
 1953 - George Wharton Pepper
 1952 - Francis Bosworth
 1951 - Franklin H. Price
 1950 - Fiske Kimball
 1949 - Frederick H. Allen
 1947 - Samuel S. Fels
 1946 - Maurice B. Fagan & Marjorie Penney
 1945 - Owen J. Roberts
 1944 - William Draper Lewis
 1943 - James M. Skinner
 1942 - William Loren Batt
 1940 - Marian Anderson
 1939 - Thomas Sovereign Gates
 1938 - Rufus M. Jones & Clarence Pickett
 1937 - Alfred Newton Richards
 1936 - George W. Wilkins
 1935 - Francis Fisher Kane
 1934 - Charles M.B. Cadwalader
 1933 - Lucy Langdon Wilson
 1932 - Earl D. Bond
 1931 - The Unknown Citizen
 1930 - Paul Philippe Cret
 1929 - Cornelius McGillicuddy (Connie Mack)
 1928 - Eli Kirk Price
 1927 - W. Herbert Burk
 1926 - Chevalier Jackson
 1925 - Samuel Yellin
 1924 - Charles C. Harrison
 1923 - Samuel S. Fleisher
 1922 - Russell H. Conwell
 1921 - Leopold Stokowski

References

External links
 

Events in Philadelphia
American awards
Awards established in 1921
1921 establishments in Pennsylvania
Non-profit organizations based in Philadelphia